Dongfeng Liuzhou Motor Co., Ltd. is a subsidiary of Dongfeng Motor Group, located in the city of Liuzhou, Guangxi, China.

Dongfeng Liuzhou Motor was founded in 1954 and entered the field of automobile production in 1969. It manufactures passenger cars sold in China under the brand Dongfeng Forthing (Fengxing); these include the Jingyi small multi-purpose vehicle also known as Joyear, the Jingyi S50 sedan and the S500 large multi-purpose vehicle, as well as two types of vans, the Ling Zhi (also known as Future) and the CM7. Some of these models are also sold in Latin American markets such as Chile and Peru under the brands Dongfeng, DFM or DFLZ.

Dongfeng Liuzhou also produces trucks under the brands Dongfeng Chenglong, BaLong and LongKa.

Products
The following vehicles are currently available.

Forthing (Fengxing) series:
Fengxing T5/ Fengxing T5L compact crossover 
Fengxing T5 EVO compact crossover 
Fengxing SX6 mid-size crossover/ Fengxing SX6 EV electric mid-size crossover
Fengxing S500 compact MPV/ Fengxing S500 EV electric compact MPV
Fengxing F600 MPV
Fengxing CM7 MPV
Forthing Yacht MPV
Lingzhi vans:
Lingzhi V3 panel van
Lingzhi M3 MPV
Lingzhi M5 MPV/ M5 EV electric MPV
Joyear (Jingyi) series:
Jingyi S50 compact sedan/ Jingyi S50 EV electric compact sedan
Jingyi X3 subcompact crossover
Jingyi X5 compact crossover
Jingyi X6 mid-size crossover

Product Gallery

References

External links
 

Car manufacturers of China
Dongfeng Motor divisions and subsidiaries
Companies based in Liuzhou